Dhime is a former village development committee in Jajarkot District in the Karnali Province of Nepal. According to the 1991 Nepal census it had a population of about 4512 living in 807 different individual households.

Dhime has got one of many beautiful natural scenery, a jungle and a river to mention a few. The flowing waters of the river could have been used as a potential source of hydro-electric power; however, due to immense measure taken by the people to preserve the habitat and to few think in other lines that its due to a lack of development. So the majority of Dhime's natural resources are not being explored for human use. At Dhime people also cultivate several varieties of rice. One such variety is of the Asian rice known as "palte" in the local language.

References

External links
UN map of the municipalities of Jajarkot District

Populated places in Jajarkot District